Daniel Alejandro Rendón Ayala (born November 8, 1991, in Guadalajara, Jalisco) is a professional Mexican footballer who currently plays for Alebrijes de Oaxaca.

External links

References

1991 births
Living people
Mexican footballers
Club Atlético Zacatepec players
Alebrijes de Oaxaca players
Ascenso MX players
Liga Premier de México players
Footballers from Guadalajara, Jalisco
Association football fullbacks